The 1973 Boston University Terriers football team was an American football team that represented Boston University as a member of the Yankee Conference during the 1973 NCAA Division II football season. In their first season under head coach Paul Kemp, the Terriers compiled a 3–7 record (1–4 against conference opponents) and were outscored by a total of 170 to 95.

Boston University played its home games on Nickerson Field, which was part of the Case Sports Complex and was formerly known as Braves Field, the home of the Boston Braves.

Schedule

References

Boston University
Boston University Terriers football seasons
Boston University Terriers football